The Devastators (1901) is a novel by Australian writer Ada Cambridge.

Story outline

The novel considers the impacts on two ill-made marriages: Peggy Le Marchand is married to Harry Bedingfield, but should have married Dr. Dallas who is actually married to Mimi Rochester.

Critical reception

A reviewer in Freeman's Journal was underwhelmed by the book noting it is "described as 'a novel with a purpose.' Masters of the craft of bookmaking like Dickens also wrote novels with a purpose, the moral of which ran in a thin red line of tragedy carefully woven into a healthy story in which comedy had its share.' In The Devastators the purpose is the whole plot; and, however excellent it may be to hold up the mirror to ill-chosen marriages for the instruction of others, the result is rather dismal to the reader in this case."

Notes 

In her autobiography Thirty Years in Australia published in 1930, Cambridge made the following confession: "When I wrote a novel called The Devastators I knew that I was laying down a rule contradicted in my own circle by two glaring exceptions. This bright and beautiful woman is one of them; the other is a person still nearer to me. I had to apologise to both of them when that book came out. From their childhood they have been exposed to flatteries that should have spoiled them utterly; both have proved unspoilable. In the case of one of the pretty faces, it does not even care to look at itself in the glass; the mere ordinary vanity of the ordinary female is lacking. So that to this large extent my theory of the effect of physical charm upon its possessor is discredited. While I am glad to state the fact, I am sorry to remain of the opinion that such exceptions are exceptions, and that the rule is still the rule."

See also

 1901 in Australian literature

References

1901 Australian novels
Novels about marriage